Goat Island was a collaborative performance group based in Chicago, Illinois, U.S., and founded in 1987. In 2006, Goat Island announced that their ninth performance, The Lastmaker (2007), would be the last work that they would create as a company. Goat Island ended with final performances of The Lastmaker at Swain Hall, University of North Carolina, Chapel Hill, in February 2009. As their final project, they created a film based on The Lastmaker, published under the title A Last, A Quartet a collection of films, which also contained previous films made by Goat Island. Goat Island members have included, Karen Christopher (1990-2009), Joan Dickinson (1988-90), Matthew Goulish (1987-2009), Lin Hixson (director, 1997-2009), Mark Jeffery (1996-2009), Greg McCain (1987-95), Timothy McCain (1987-95), Antonio Poppe (1995-1996), Bryan Saner (1995-2009), Charissa Tolentino (2008) and Litó Walkey (2002-9).

Performances
Soldier, Child, Tortured Man (1987)
We Got A Date (1989)
Can't Take Johnny to the Funeral (1991)
It's Shifting, Hank (1993)
How Dear To Me the Hour When Daylight Dies (1996)
The Sea & Poison (1998)
It's an Earthquake in My Heart (2001)
When will the September roses bloom? Last night was only a comedy (2004)
The Lastmaker (2007)

References

Sources
 Bottoms, Stephen J., and Matthew Goulish, eds. 2007. Small Acts of Repair: Performance, Ecology, and Goat Island. London and New York: Routledge. .
 Cull, Laura. 2009. "Goat Island, Deleuze's Bergonism and the Experience of Duration." In Deleuze and Performance. Ed. Laura Cull. Deleuze Connections ser. Edinburgh: Edinburgh UP. . 132-146.
 Goat Island, 2000. "School Book 2: Goat Island. Chicago: Goat Island and The School of the Art Institute of Chicago.
 Goulish, Matthew. 2000. 39 Microlectures: In Proximity of Performance. London and New York: Routledge. .
 Hixson, Lin and Goulish, Matthew. 2007. "A Lasting Provocation". TDR: The Drama Review 51.4 (T 196 Winter): 2-3.
 Lowe, Nicholas, and Skaggs, Sarah,  2020 (editor Mike Vanden Heuvel) "Goat Island". American Theatre Ensembles Volume 1. Post-1970: Theatre X, Mabou Mines, Goat Island, Lookingglass Theatre, Elevator Repair Service, and SITI Company. Methuen Drama/Bloomsbury Press, London, UK.  129-221.

External links
Brooklyn Rail Conversation with Lin Hixson and Matthew Goulish
 Official website

Theatre companies in Chicago
Performance artist collectives
Performing groups established in 1987